Viaje infinito is the fourth album by Chilean singer Nicole. It was released in May, 2002, in the USA, but also was released in June, 2002, in Chile, her native country.

Track listing
 "Amanecer" - 3:30
 "Dime" - 4:01
 "Viaje Infinito" - 4:29
 "Háblame" - 3:56
 "Sin Ti" - 4:08
 "Días" - 3:54
 "Quiero" - 3:40
 "Lágrimas De Sal" - 4:01
 "Un Lugar" - 3:41
 "Vida" - 4:10
 "Para Siempre" - 3:05

References

2002 albums
Nicole (Chilean singer) albums

pt:Nicole (cantora chilena)#Discografia